Richard Wharton may refer to:

Richard Wharton (actor), American actor
Richard Wharton (15th-century MP) for Appleby, 1419 and Westmorland
Richard Wharton (Secretary to the Treasury) (c. 1764–1828), MP for Durham, 1802 and 1806